The South Lebanon conflict, designated by Israel as the Security Zone in Lebanon Campaign, was a protracted armed conflict that took place in southern Lebanon from 1985 to 2000. It saw fighting between the Christian-dominated South Lebanon Army (SLA) and Hezbollah-led Muslim guerrillas within the Israeli-occupied "Security Zone"; the SLA had military and logistical support from the Israel Defense Forces over the course of the conflict and operated under the jurisdiction of the Israeli-backed South Lebanon provisional administration, which succeeded the earlier Israeli-backed State of Free Lebanon. It can also refer to the continuation of the earlier conflict in this region that began with the Palestinian insurgency in southern Lebanon, which targeted Christian Lebanese factions and Israel following the expulsion of the Palestine Liberation Organization (PLO) from Jordan after Black September. Historical tensions between Palestinian refugees and Lebanese factions fomented the violent internal political struggle between the latter. In light of these factors, the South Lebanon conflict can be seen as a part of the Lebanese Civil War.

In earlier conflicts prior to the 1982 Israeli invasion of Lebanon, including the 1978 South Lebanon conflict, Israel attempted to eradicate PLO bases from Lebanon and provided support to Maronite Christian militias in the country amidst the Lebanese Civil War; the 1982 invasion resulted in the PLO's departure from Lebanon. Israel's subsequent establishment of the Security Zone in southern Lebanon successfully shielded Israeli civilians from cross-border attacks by Palestinian militants, but came at a great cost to Lebanese civilians and Palestinians. Despite Israel's success in eradicating PLO bases in Lebanon and its partial withdrawal in 1985, the invasion increased the severity of conflict with local Lebanese militias and resulted in the consolidation of several local Shia Islamic movements (including Hezbollah and Amal) from a previously unorganized guerrilla movement in the Shia-majority south. Over the years, combined casualties grew higher as both sides used more modern weaponry and as Hezbollah progressed in its tactics. By the early 1990s, Hezbollah, with support from Iran and Syria, emerged as the leading group and military power, monopolizing guerrilla activity in southern Lebanon.

With no clear end-game in Lebanon, the Israeli military was unfamiliar with the type of warfare that Hezbollah waged, and while it could inflict losses on Hezbollah, there was no long-term strategy. With Hezbollah increasingly targeting the Galilee with rockets, the official purpose of the Security Zone—to protect Israel's northern communities—seemed contradictory. Hezbollah also excelled at psychological warfare, often recording their attacks on Israeli troops. Following the 1997 Israeli helicopter disaster, the Israeli public began to seriously question whether the military occupation of southern Lebanon was worth maintaining. The Four Mothers movement rose to the forefront of the public discourse, and played a leading role in swaying the public in favour of a complete withdrawal.

It was common knowledge in Israel that the Security Zone was not permanent, but the Israeli government hoped that a withdrawal could be carried out in the context of a wider agreement with Syria and, by extension, Lebanon. However, talks with Syria failed. By 2000, following up on his promise during the 1999 Israeli general election, the newly elected Israeli prime minister Ehud Barak unilaterally withdrew Israeli forces from southern Lebanon within the year, in accordance with United Nations Security Council Resolution 425 of 1978; Israel's withdrawal consequently resulted in the immediate and total collapse of the SLA, with many of its members escaping to Israel. The Lebanese government and Hezbollah still consider the withdrawal incomplete until Israel withdraws from Shebaa Farms. In 2020, Israel retrospectively recognized the conflict as a full-scale war.

Background

Following the 1948 Arab–Israeli War, the 1949 Armistice Agreements were signed with United Nations mediation. The Lebanese–Israeli agreement created the armistice line, which coincided exactly with the existing international boundary between Lebanon and Palestine from the Mediterranean to the Syrian tri-point on the Hasbani River. From this tri-point on the Hasbani the boundary follows the river northward to the village of Ghajar, then northeast, forming the Lebanese–Syrian border. (The southern line from the tri-point represents the Palestine–Syria border of 1923.) Israeli forces captured and occupied 13 villages in Lebanese territory during the conflict, including parts of Marjayun, Bint Jubayl, and areas near the Litani River, but withdrew following international pressure and the armistice agreement.

Although the Israel–Lebanon border remained relatively quiet, entries in the diary of Moshe Sharett point to a continued territorial interest in the area. On 16 May 1954, during a joint meeting of senior officials of the defense and foreign affairs ministries, Ben Gurion raised the issue of Lebanon due to renewed tensions between Syria and Iraq, and internal trouble in Syria. Dayan expressed his enthusiastic support for entering Lebanon, occupying the necessary territory and creating a Christian regime that would ally itself with Israel. The issue was raised again in discussions at the Protocol of Sèvres.

The Israeli victory in the 1967 Six-Day War vastly expanded their area occupied in all neighboring countries, with the exception of Lebanon, but this extended the length of the effective Lebanon–Israel border, with the occupation of the Golan Heights. Although with a stated requirement for defense, later Israeli expansion into Lebanon under very similar terms followed the 1977 elections, which for the first time, brought the Revisionist Likud to power.

Emerging conflict between Israel and Palestinian militants

Beginning with the late 1960s and especially in the 1970s, following the defeat of PLO in Black September in Jordan, displaced Palestinians, including militants affiliated with the Palestinian Liberation Organization, began to settle in South Lebanon. The unrestrained buildup of Palestinian militia, and the large autonomy they exercised, led to the popular term "Fatahland" for South Lebanon. Since the mid 1970s the tensions between the various Lebanese factions and Palestinians had exploded, resulting in Lebanese Civil War.

Following multiple attacks launched by Palestinian organizations in the 1970, which increased with the Lebanese Civil War, the Israeli government decided to take action. Desiring to break up and destroy this PLO stronghold, Israel briefly invaded Lebanon in 1978, but the results of this invasion were mixed. The PLO was pushed north of the Litani River and a buffer zone was created to keep them from returning, with the placement of the United Nations Interim Force in Lebanon (UNIFIL). In addition and despite earlier covert support, Israel established a second buffer with renegade Saad Haddad's Christian Free Lebanon Army enclave (initially based only in the towns of Marjayoun and Qlayaa); the now-public Israeli military commitment to the Christian forces was strengthened. For the first time however, Israel received substantive adverse publicity in the world press due to damage in South Lebanon, in which some 200,000 Lebanese (mostly Shia Muslims) fled the area and ended up in the southern suburbs of Beirut; this indirectly resulted in the Syrian forces in Lebanon turning against the Christians in late June and complicated the dynamics of the ongoing Lebanese Civil War.

1982 Israeli invasion of Lebanon

In 1982, the Israeli military began "Operation Peace for Galilee", a full-scale invasion of Lebanese territory. The invasion followed the 1978 Litani Operation, which gave Israel possession of the territory near the Israeli–Lebanese border. This follow-up invasion attempted to weaken the PLO as a unified political and military force and eventually led to the withdrawal of PLO and Syrian forces from Lebanon. By the end of this operation, Israel got control over Lebanon from Beirut southward, and attempted to install a pro-Israeli government in Beirut to sign a peace accord with it. This goal had never realized, partly because of the assassination of President Bashir Gemayel in September 1982, and the refusal of the Lebanese Parliament to endorse the accord. The withdrawal of the PLO forces in 1982 forced some Lebanese nationalists to start a resistance against the Israeli army led by the Lebanese Communist Party and Amal movement. During this time, some Amal members started the formation of an Islamic group supported by Iran that was the nucleus of the future "Islamic Resistance", and eventually become Hezbollah.

Chronology

1982–1985 occupation and emergence of Hezbollah

Increased hostilities against the US resulted in the April 1983 United States Embassy bombing.  In response, the US brokered the May 17 Agreement, in an attempt to stall hostilities between Israel and Lebanon. However, this agreement eventually failed to take shape, and hostilities continued. In October, the United States Marines barracks in Beirut was bombed (usually attributed to the Islamic Resistance groups). Following this incident, the United States withdrew its military forces from Lebanon.

Suicide bombings became increasingly popular at this time, and were a major concern of the Israel Defense Forces (IDF) both near Beirut and in the South. Among the most serious were the two suicide bombings against the Israeli headquarters in Tyre, which killed 103 soldiers, border policemen, and Shin Bet agents, and also killed 49–56 Lebanese. Israel believes those acts were among the first organized actions made by Shi'ite militants, later forming into Hizbullah. Subsequently, Israel withdrew from the Shouf Mountains, but continued to occupy Lebanon south of the Awali River.

An increased number of Islamic militias began operating in South Lebanon, launching guerrilla attacks on Israeli and pro-Israel militia positions. Israeli forces often responded with increased security measures and airstrikes on militant positions, and casualties on all sides steadily climbed. In a vacuum left with eradication of PLO, the disorganized Islamic militants in South Lebanon began to consolidate. The emerging Hezbollah, soon to become the preeminent Islamic militia, evolved during this period. However, scholars disagree as to when Hezbollah came to be regarded as a distinct entity. Over time, a number of Shi’a group members were slowly assimilated into the organization, such as Islamic Jihad members, Organization of the Oppressed on Earth, and the Revolutionary Justice Organization.

Israeli withdrawal to southern Lebanon

On 16 February 1985, Israel withdrew from Sidon and turned it over to the Lebanese Army, but faced attacks: 15 Israelis were killed and 105 wounded during the withdrawal. Dozens of SLA members were also assassinated. Under the Iron Fist policy, Israel retaliated in a series of raids. On March 11, Israeli forces raided the town of Zrariyah, killing 40 men. On March 10, a suicide bomber killed twelve Israeli soldiers from a convoy near Metula, inside Israel. From mid-February to mid-March, the Israelis lost 18 dead and 35 wounded. On 9 April, a Shiite girl drove a car bomb into an IDF convoy, and the following day, a soldier was killed by a land mine. During that same period, Israeli forces killed 80 Lebanese guerrillas in five weeks. Another 1,800 Shi'as were taken as prisoners. Israel withdrew from the Bekaa valley on 24 April, and from Tyre on the 29th, but continued to occupy a security zone in Southern Lebanon.

Beginning of the Security Zone conflict
In 1985 Hezbollah released an open letter to "The Downtrodden in Lebanon and in the World", which stated that the world was divided between the oppressed and the oppressors. The oppressors were named to be mainly the United States and Israel. This letter legitimized and praised the use of violence against the enemies of Islam, mainly the West.

Israeli and SLA forces in the security zone began to come under attack. The first major incident occurred in August 1985, when Lebanese guerrillas believed to have been from Amal ambushed an Israeli convoy: two Israeli soldiers and three of the attackers were killed in the ensuing firefight.

Lebanese guerrilla attacks, mainly the work of Hezbollah, increased. Fighting the Israeli occupation included hit-and-run guerrilla attacks, suicide bombings, and the Katyusha rocket attacks on civilian targets in Northern Israel, including Kiryat Shmona. The Katyusha proved to be an effective weapon and became a mainstay of Hezbollah military capabilities in South Lebanon. The attacks resulted in both military and civilian casualties. However, a considerable number of Lebanese guerillas were killed fighting Israeli and SLA troops, and many were captured. Prisoners were often detained in Israeli military prisons, or by the SLA in the Khiam detention center, where detainees were often tortured. Lebanese prisoners in Israel were arrested and detained for participating in guerrilla movements, and many were held for long periods of time.

In 1987 Hezbollah fighters from the Islamic Resistance stormed and conquered an outpost in Bra’shit belonging to the South Lebanon Army in the security zone. A number of its defenders were killed or taken prisoner and the Hezbollah flag was raised on top of it. A Sherman tank was blown up and a M113 Armored Personal Carrier was captured and driven triumphantly all the way to Beirut. In September of that year, Israeli aircraft bombed three PLO bases on the outskirts of the Ain al-Hilweh refugee camp, killing up to 41 people. An Israeli spokesman said the targets were being used by terrorist cells that were planning raids against Israel.

On 2 January 1988,  Israeli airstrikes on Ain al-Hilweh and along the coast North of Sidon left some 19 dead and 14 wounded. Three members of PFLP-GC and three from PSP were amongst those killed. Seven children and one woman were also killed. It was reported that the raids were retaliation for the 25 November 1987 PFLP-GC hang-glider attack in which six IDF soldiers were killed. In the previous two years there had been about forty Israeli air strikes on Lebanon.
In May, Israel launched an offensive codenamed Operation Law and Order in which 1,500–2,000 Israeli soldiers raided the area around the Lebanese village of Meidoun. In two days of fighting, the IDF killed 50 Hizbullah fighters while losing 3 dead and 17 wounded.
On 18 October 1988 eight Israeli soldiers were killed by a Hizbullah suicide car bomb. The Israelis responded with extensive air and land attacks.

After Israel destroyed Hezbollah's headquarters in the town of Marrakeh, a Hezbollah suicide bomber destroyed an Israeli transport truck carrying soldiers on the Israel-Lebanon border. In response, Israeli forces ambushed two Hezbollah vehicles, killing eight Hezbollah fighters.

On 27 July 1989 the Hizbullah leader in South Lebanon, Sheikh Abdel Karim Obeid and two of his aides, were abducted from his home in Jibchit, by IDF commandos. The night-time raid was planned by then Minister of Defence Yitzhak Rabin. Hizbullah responded by announcing the execution of Colonel Higgins, a senior American officer working with UNIFIL, who had been kidnapped in February 1988. The Obeid kidnapping led to the adoption of United Nations Security Council Resolution 638, which condemned all hostage takings by all sides.

1989 Taif Agreement
The Lebanese Civil War officially came to an end with the 1989 Ta'if Accord, but the armed combat continued at least until October 1990, and in South Lebanon until at least 1991. In fact, the continued Israeli presence in South Lebanon resulted in continued low-intensity warfare and sporadic major combat until the Israeli withdrawal in 2000.

On 29 March 1991 a car bomb in Antelias district of East Beirut killed 3 people.

On 30 December 1991 a car bomb killed 15 bystanders and injured over 100 in West Beirut. The attack took place in the mainly Shia Basta quarter.

Outbreak of hostilities after the Lebanese Civil War

Though the majority of the Lebanese civil war conflicts ended in the months following the Ta'if Accord, Israel kept maintaining a military presence in South Lebanon. Consequently, the Islamic Resistance, by now dominated by Hezbollah, continued operations in the South. 

Several days of Israeli air raids ended on 4 June 1991. Targets, in the biggest attack since 1982, included buildings belonging to Fateh, PFLP, DFLP and Fateh-Revolutionary Command. Twenty-two people were killed and 82 wounded.

A month later, 4 July 1991, following the failure of disarmament negotiations, as required by the Taif agreement, the Lebanese Army attacked Palestinian positions in Southern Lebanon. The offensive, involving 10,000 troops against an estimated 5,000 militia, lasted 3 days and ended with the Army taking all the Palestinian positions around Sidon. In the agreement that followed all heavy weapons were surrendered and infantry weapons only allowed in the two refugee camps, Ain al-Hilweh and Mieh Mieh. 73 people were killed in the fighting, and 200 wounded, mostly Palestinian.
 
Hezbollah’s leader Abbas al-Musawi had announced that they would not give up their weapons. “Our guns are a red line that cannot be crossed”. On 16th July 1991 they ambushed an Israeli patrol north of the security zone in Kufr Huna. Three Israeli soldiers, including 2 officers, were killed and four wounded. One Hizbollah fighter was killed. The following day the South Lebanon Army destroyed 14 houses and burnt crops in neighbouring Majd al-Zun.

Prior to their disbandment militiamen from Amal were also active in South Lebanon. On 29 July 1991 they killed three members of the South Lebanon Army (SLA). Israel responded with shelling that killed two villagers. On 23 August 1991 two members of the SLA were killed by members of Amal. The Israeli Army responded the following day with shelling which killed one civilian. Two Irish soldiers serving with UNIFIL were amongst the wounded.

There was further violence at the end of 1991 with an Irish soldier serving with UNIFIL killed by the SLA on the 15th November and three Lebanese Army soldiers killed by an Israeli rocket on 25th November.

On 16 February 1992, al-Musawi was assassinated, along with his wife, son and four others when an Israeli AH-64 Apache helicopter gunships fired three missiles at his motorcade. The Israeli attack came in retaliation for the killings of three Israeli soldiers two days earlier when their camp was infiltrated. Hezbollah responded with rocket fire onto the Israeli security zone, and Israel then fired back and sent two armored columns past the security zone to hit Hezbollah strongholds in Kafra and Yater. Musawi was succeeded by Hassan Nasrallah. One of Nasrallah's first public declarations was the "retribution" policy: If Israel hit Lebanese civilian targets, then Hezbollah would retaliate with attacks on Israeli territory. Meanwhile, Hezbollah continued attacks against IDF targets within occupied Lebanese territory. In response to the attack, Ehud Sadan, the chief of security at the Israeli Embassy in Turkey was assassinated by a car bomb. Islamic Jihad (Lebanon) is reported to have claimed that the 1992 attack on Israeli embassy in Buenos Aires, in which 29 people were killed, was their response.

Three months after the assassination the Israeli Air Force launched five air raids on Lebanon in six days. Some of the targets struck were as far north as Baalbek. On the final day, 26 May 1992, there were more than 40 missile strikes. Over 20 civilians were killed during the offensive.

In 1993, hostilities flared again. After a month of Hezbollah shelling on Israeli towns and attacks on its soldiers, Israel conducted a seven-day operation in July 1993 called Operation Accountability in order to hit Hezbollah. One Israeli soldier and 8–50 Hezbollah fighters were killed in the operation, along with 2 Israeli and 118 Lebanese civilians. After one week of fighting in South Lebanon, a mutual agreement mediated by the United States prohibited attacks on civilian targets by both parts.

The end of Operation Accountability saw a few days of calm before light shelling resumed. On 17 August, a major artillery exchange took place, and two days later, nine Israeli soldiers were killed in two Hezbollah attacks. Israel responded with airstrikes against Hezbollah positions, killing at least two Hezbollah fighters.

Continued fighting in the late 1990s

In May 1994, Israeli commandos kidnapped an Amal leader, Mustafa Dirani, and in June, an Israeli airstrike against a training camp killed 30–45 Hezbollah cadets. Hezbollah retaliated by firing four barrages of Katyusha rockets into northern Israel.

On 31 March 1995, Rida Yasin, also known as Abu Ali, was killed by a single rocket fired from an Israeli helicopter while in a car near Derdghaya in the Israeli security zone 10km east of Tyre. Yasin was a senior military commander in southern Lebanon. His companion in the car was also killed. An Israeli civilian was killed and fifteen wounded in the retaliatory rocket fire. In May 1995, four Hezbollah fighters were killed in a firefight with Israeli troops while trying to infiltrate an Israeli position.

Operation Grapes of Wrath in 1996 resulted in the deaths of more than 150 Lebanese civilians, most of them in the shelling of a United Nations base at Qana. After seventeen days of bombing a ceasefire was agreed between Israel and Hezbollah, committing to avoid civilian casualties; however, combat continued for at least two months. A total of 14 Hezbollah fighters, about a dozen Syrian soldiers, and 3 Israeli soldiers were killed in the fighting.

Brig. Gen. Eli Amitai, the IDF commander of the security zone, was lightly injured 14 December 1996 when an IDF convoy he was travelling in was ambushed in the eastern sector of the security zone. Less than a week later Amitai was again lightly injured when Hezbollah unleashed a mortar barrage on an SLA position near Bra'shit he was visiting together with Maj. Gen. Amiram Levine, head of the IDF's Northern Command.

In December 1996, two SLA soldiers were killed in three days of fighting, and a Hezbollah fighter was also killed by Israeli soldiers.

On 4 February 1997, two Israeli transport helicopters collided over She'ar Yashuv in Northern Israel while waiting for clearance to fly into Lebanon. A total of 73 IDF soldiers were killed in the disaster. On 28 February one Israeli soldier and four Hezbollah guerrillas were killed in a clash.

Throughout 1997, Israeli special forces, particularly the Egoz Reconnaissance Unit, hampered Hezbollah's ability to infiltrate the security zone and plant roadside bombs by staking out Hezbollah infiltration trails. Encouraged by these successes, Israeli commandos began conducting raids north of the security zone to kill Hezbollah commanders. In one particular raid, carried out on the night of 3–4 August 1997, Golani Brigade soldiers raided the village of Kfeir and left behind three roadside bombs packed with ball bearings that were detonated from an Israeli Air Force UAV hours later, killing five Hezbollah members including two commanders. However, on 28 August, a major friendly fire incident occurred in Wadi Saluki during a clash between IDF troops from the Golani Brigade, together with air and artillery support, and Amal militants. Although four Amal militants were killed, Israeli shelling started a fire that engulfed the area, killing four soldiers.

On 5 September 1997, a seaborne raid by 16 Israeli Shayetet 13 naval commandos failed after the troops stumbled into a Hezbollah and Amal ambush. As the force headed towards the coastal town of Ansariye, it was ambushed with IEDs and subjected to withering fire that killed the commander, Lt. Col. Yossi Korakin, and caused bombs being carried by another soldier to explode, killing more of the force. The survivors radioed for help, and Israel immediately dispatched a rescue team from Unit 669 and Sayeret Matkal in two CH-53 helicopters. A rescue force of helicopters and missile boats arrived to provide support as the rescuers evacuated the dead and survivors, conducting airstrikes. Lebanese Army anti-aircraft units put up anti aircraft fire and fired illumination rounds at the helicopters, and an Israeli F-16 subsequently attacked an anti-aircraft position. Hezbollah put up mortar fire, killing a Druze army doctor with the rescue force and damaging a helicopter and Israeli missile boats fired at the source of the mortar fire. The battle ended when Israel, by means of contacting the US government and delivering a message to be passed on to Syria and from there to Hezbollah, threatened to respond with massive force if Hezbollah tried to stop the rescue mission, causing Hezbollah and Amal to cease fire while the Lebanese Army moved in. Twelve Israelis were killed, along with six Hezbollah and Amal fighters and two Lebanese soldiers. A woman in a passing car was also killed. In 2010 Hassan Nasrallah claimed that Hezbollah had managed to hack into Israeli UAV:s flying over Lebanon and thus learn which route the commandos were planning to take and thus prepared the ambush accordingly. On September 13–14, IDF raids in Lebanon killed a further four Hezbollah fighters and six Lebanese soldiers.

On 12 September 1997, three Hezbollah fighters were killed in an ambush by Egoz commandos on the edge of the security zone. One of them was Hadi Nasrallah, the son of Hezbollah leader Hassan Nasrallah. On 25 May 1998 the remains of Israeli soldiers killed in the failed commando raid were exchanged for 65 Lebanese prisoners and the bodies of 40 Hezbollah fighters and Lebanese soldiers captured by Israel. Among the bodies returned to Lebanon were the remains of Hadi Nasrallah.

In the autumn of 1997 Hizbollah began using Sager missiles. On 8 October two IDF soldiers were killed when their tank was hit. There were six other casualties, two of them serious. The attack took place 300 metres from the border with Israel. Ten days later another soldier was killed when his tank was hit. This brought the number of Israeli soldiers killed in 1997 up to thirty nine, twelve more than in 1996. The new tactics resulted in Centurion tanks being withdrawn and the armour of the Merkava being upgraded. At the time it was reported that Hizbollah had five hundred fighters in the field at one time, whilst the IDF had 1,000 troops in the security zone alongside the SLA’s 2,000.

During 1998, 21 Israeli soldiers were killed in southern Lebanon. Israel undertook a concerted campaign to hamper Hezbollah's capabilities, and in December 1998, the Israeli military assassinated Zahi Naim Hadr Ahmed Mahabi, a Hezbollah explosives expert, north of Baalbek.

23 February 1999 an IDF paratrooper unit on a night time patrol was ambushed in south Lebanon. Major Eitan Balahsan and two lieutenants were killed and another five soldiers were wounded.

Less than a week later (28 February) a roadside bomb exploded on the road between Kaukaba and Arnoun in the Israeli-occupied security zone. Brigadier General Erez Gerstein, commander of the Golani Brigade and head of the IDF Liaison Unit in Lebanon, thus the highest ranking Israeli officer serving in Lebanon at the time, as well as two Druze Israeli soldiers and one Israeli journalist were killed in the blast.

In May 1999 Hezbollah forces simultaneously attacked 14 Israeli and SLA outposts in south Lebanon. The outpost in Beit Yahoun compound belonging to the SLA was overrun and one SLA soldier was taken prisoner. The Hizbullah fighters made off with an Armoured Personnel Carrier (APC). The area was bombed by the Israeli Air Force. The captured APC was paraded through the southern suburbs of Beirut.

In June 1999, following five days of Lebanese villages in the South coming under artillery fire, Hezbollah fired a salvo of Katusha rockets into northern Israel, injuring four people. The Israeli response was immediate. On 24-25 June the IAF launched two waves of airstrikes lasting several hours. Following the first air raids Hezbollah fired a second salvo of rockets into the centre of Kiryat Shimona killing two people. The Israeli bombing caused an estimated $52 millions worth of damage. A total of five bridges on the road south from Beirut were destroyed. Beirut itself was left in darkness when the power plant at Jamhour was hit. Here three firemen where killed by the bombs. The plant had been repaired after it had been hit in Grapes of Wrath. A telephone company’s HQ in Jieh and the Hezbollah al Manar radio station in Baalbek were also demolished. A total of eight Lebanese were killed and seventy seriously injured, two of whom were in a coma.

In August 1999, Hezbollah commander Ali Hassan Deeb, better known as Abu Hassan, a leader in Hezbollah's special force, was assassinated in an Israeli military operation. Deeb was driving in Sidon when two roadside bombs were detonated by a remote signal from a UAV overhead.

Overall, in the course of 1999, several dozen Hezbollah and Amal fighters were killed. Twelve Israeli soldiers and one civilian were also killed, one of them in accident.

2000 Israeli withdrawal and collapse of South Lebanon Army

In July 1999, Ehud Barak became Israel's Prime Minister, promising Israel would unilaterally withdraw to the international border by July 2000. Prior to his actions, many believed that Israel would only withdraw from South Lebanon upon reaching an agreement with Syria.

In January 2000, Hezbollah assassinated the commander of the South Lebanon Army's Western Brigade, Colonel Aql Hashem, at his home in the security zone. Hashem had been responsible for day-to-day operations of the SLA and was a leading candidate to succeed General Antoine Lahad. After this assassination there were doubts about the leadership of the South Lebanon Army (SLA). The pursuit and assassination of Hashim was documented step by step and the footage was broadcast on Hezbollah TV channel al-Manar. The operation and the way it was presented in media dealt a devastating blow to the morale in the SLA.

During the spring of 2000, Hezbollah operations stepped up considerably, with persistent harassment of Israeli military outposts in occupied Lebanese territory. As preparation for the major withdrawal plan, Israeli forces began abandoning several forward positions within the security zone of South Lebanon. On 24 May, Israel announced that it would withdraw all troops from South Lebanon. All Israeli forces had withdrawn from Lebanon by the end of the next day, more than six weeks before its stated deadline of 7 July.

The Israeli pullout resulted in the collapse of the SLA and the rapid advance of Hezbollah forces into the area. As the Israeli Defense Forces (IDF) withdrew, thousands of Shi'a Lebanese rushed back to the South to reclaim their properties. This withdrawal was widely considered a victory for Hezbollah and boosted its popularity in Lebanon. The completeness of the withdrawal is still disputed as Lebanese Government and Hezbollah claim Israel still holds Shebaa farms, a small piece of territory on the Lebanon-Israel-Syria border, with disputed sovereignty.

As a Syrian-backed Lebanese government refused to demarcate its border with Israel, Israel worked with UN cartographers led by regional coordinator Terje Rød-Larsen to certify Israel had withdrawn from all occupied Lebanese territory. On 16 June 2000, UN Security Council concluded that Israel had indeed withdrawn its forces from all of Lebanon, in accordance with United Nations Security Council Resolution 425 (1978).

Israel considered this move as tactical withdrawal since it always regarded the Security Zone as a buffer zone to defend Israel's citizens. By ending the occupation, Barak's cabinet assumed it would improve its worldwide image. Ehud Barak has argued that "Hezbollah would have enjoyed international legitimacy in their struggle against a foreign occupier", if the Israelis had not unilaterally withdrawn without a peace agreement.

Aftermath

Upon Israel's withdrawal, an increasing fear that Hezbollah would seek vengeance against those thought to have supported Israel became widespread among the Christian Lebanese of the Southern Lebanon. During and after the withdrawal around 10,000 Lebanese, mostly Maronites, fled into Galilee. Hezbollah later met with Lebanese Christian clerics to reassure them that the Israeli withdrawal was a victory for Lebanon as a nation, not just one sect or militia.

The tentative peace, resulting from the withdrawal, did not last. On 7 October 2000 Hezbollah attacked Israel. In a cross-border raid, three Israeli soldiers, who were patrolling the Lebanese border were attacked and abducted. The event escalated into a 2-month fire exchanges between Israel and Hezbollah, primarily at the Hermon ridge. The bodies of the abducted soldiers were returned to Israel in a January 2004 prisoner exchange involving 450 Lebanese prisoners held in Israeli jails. The long-time Lebanese prisoner Samir al-Quntar was excluded from the deal. The government of Israel, however, had agreed to a "further arrangement", whereby Israel would release Samir al-Quntar if it was supplied with "tangible information on the fate of captive navigator Ron Arad".

According to Harel and Issacharoff the second phase of the prisoner exchange deal was only a "legal gimmick". Israel was not satisfied with the information supplied by Hezbollah and refused to release al-Quntar. "Cynics may well ask whether it was worth getting entangled in the Second Lebanon War just to keep Kuntar […] in prison for an extra few years."

In July 2006, Hezbollah performed a cross-border raid while shelling Israeli towns and villages. During the raid Hezbollah succeeded in kidnapping two Israeli soldiers and killing eight others. In retaliation Israel began the 2006 Lebanon War to rescue the abducted soldiers and to create a bufferzone in Southern Lebanon.

See also
 Israeli occupation of Southern Lebanon
 Syrian occupation of Lebanon
 2008 conflict in Lebanon
 List of modern conflicts in the Middle East

Notes

South Lebanon conflict (1985–2000)
1980s in Lebanon
1990s in Lebanon
2000 in Lebanon
1980s in Israel
1990s in Israel
2000 in Israel
Military history of Israel
Iran–Israel proxy conflict
Israeli–Lebanese conflict
Hezbollah–Israel conflict